The 1989 Polish Speedway season was the 1989 season of motorcycle speedway in Poland.

Individual

Polish Individual Speedway Championship
The 1989 Individual Speedway Polish Championship final was held on 15 October at Leszno.

Golden Helmet
The 1989 Golden Golden Helmet organised by the Polish Motor Union (PZM) was the 1989 event for the league's leading riders. The final was held over two rounds.

Junior Championship
 winner - Piotr Świst

Silver Helmet
 winner - Piotr Świst

Bronze Helmet
 winner - Jacek Rempała

Pairs

Polish Pairs Speedway Championship
The 1989 Polish Pairs Speedway Championship was the 1989 edition of the Polish Pairs Speedway Championship. The final was held on 6 July at Leszno.

Team

Team Speedway Polish Championship
The 1989 Team Speedway Polish Championship was the 1989 edition of the Team Polish Championship. 

Unia Leszno won the gold medal for the third consecutive season. The team included Roman Jankowski, Zenon Kasprzak, Piotr Pawlicki Sr. and Zbigniew Krakowski.

First League

Second League

References

Poland Individual
Poland Team
Speedway
1989 in Polish speedway